Zañartu is a surname. Notable people with the surname include:

Aníbal Zañartu (1847–1902), Chilean political figure
Federico Errázuriz Zañartu (1825–1877), Chilean political figure
Sady Zañartu (1893–1983), Chilean writer

See also
Guardiamarina Zañartu Airport (IATA: WPU, ICAO: SCGZ), airport serving Puerto Williams in the southern tip of Chile